Conserved oligomeric Golgi complex subunit 4 is a protein that in humans is encoded by the COG4 gene.

Multiprotein complexes are key determinants of Golgi apparatus structure and its capacity for intracellular transport and glycoprotein modification. Several complexes have been identified, including the Golgi transport complex (GTC), the LDLC complex, which is involved in glycosylation reactions, and the SEC34 complex, which is involved in vesicular transport. These 3 complexes are identical and have been termed the conserved oligomeric Golgi (COG) complex, which includes COG4 (Ungar et al., 2002).[supplied by OMIM]

Interactions
COG4 has been shown to interact with COG7, COG2, COG1 and COG5.

Clinical

Mutations in this gene have been associated with Saul-Wilson syndrome.

References

Further reading

External links
  GeneReviews/NCBI/NIH/UW entry on Congenital Disorders of Glycosylation Overview